Robert Ray Shafer (born April 10, 1958) is an American character actor who has appeared in film, television, commercials, voice-over and theater. Shafer, sometimes credited as Bobby Ray Shafer, is perhaps best known for playing Bob Vance, Vance Refrigeration on the American sitcom The Office, and has amassed a substantial cult following for his portrayal of Officer Ted Warnicky (more commonly known as Joe Vickers) in the 1989 horror-comedy Psycho Cop and the sequel Psycho Cop 2.

Early life 
Robert Ray Shafer, Jr. was born in Charleston, West Virginia on April 10, 1958. He attended high school in Romeo, Michigan and graduated in 1976. Shafer then attended Broward College before moving to Los Angeles to pursue acting.

Filmography

Film

Television

References

1958 births
Living people
Actors from Charleston, West Virginia
Male actors from West Virginia
American male film actors
American male television actors
Broward College alumni